HT-0712, also known as IPL-455903, is an experimental cognitive enhancing drug (nootropic) which is currently undergoing clinical trials.  It is currently being licensed by Helicon Therapeutics in San Diego, California.  It was originally discovered and tested as part of a preclinical anti-inflammatory program by Inflazyme Pharmaceuticals.

Mechanism of action
HT-0712 appears to act as a PDE4 inhibitor, thereby increasing cAMP levels.  When cAMP levels are increased in neurons, this may trigger activation of cAMP response element-binding proteins (CREB).  CREBs are transcription factors involved in the formation of long-term memory.

The side effects of the drug are not yet fully known.

Research
A 2014 study found that HT-0712 significantly boosted memory formation in mice. Data also indicated that HT-0712 may be effective to treat age-associated memory impairment in humans.

References

External links
 United States Patent 20040224316
 PDF file regarding Helicon's commencement of Phase I trials

Lactams
Nootropics
PDE4 inhibitors
Phenol ethers
Cyclopentyl compounds
3-Tolyl compounds